Mohammad Mozammel Huq (1860–1933) was an Indian Bengali-language poet, novelist, magistrate and educationist. His writings were said to have been inspired by a "Muslim renaissance".

Early life and education
Mohammad Mozammel Huq was born in 1860, to a Bengali Muslim family from the village of Baweegachi, not far from the town of Shantipur, located in the Nadia district of the erstwhile Bengal Presidency. His father, Nasiruddin Ahmad, died during his childhood, and Huq was raised by his maternal grandfather in Shantipur. His talent at the vernacular examinations led to him receiving a scholarship. After completing his studies at the Tamachika Bari English School in 1285 BS (1878 CE), he enrolled at the Shantipur Municipal High School.

Career 
He started his career as a teacher at the Ramnagar Vernacular School in Shantipur, before transferring to the Shantipur Junior Jubilee Madrasah (later Shantipur Muslim High School) in 1887. Huq has also worked as a teaching assistant at the Tamachika Bengal School. In 1919, Ashutosh Mukherjee appointed Huq to be the examiner of Bengali language for matriculation examinations, after noticing his literary talent. He was the examiner until 1933. Huq served as the commissioner of Shantipur Municipality for 40 years, and was its vice-chairman for three years. For 30 years, he was a member of the Nadia District Board's Education Committee and was an honorary magistrate of the district for 20 years.

Journalism and writings

Huq's poetic talent was evident from his childhood days, though he excelled more in prose. He translated the Persian epic Shahnama into Bengali in 1901. Among his novels are Zohra and Daraf Khan Gazi. His career in writing officially began as a journalist for the Calcutta Weekly Samay. He published and edited for several magazines throughout his lifetime such as the Lahari (1899), Mudgal, Shantipur Deepika, Bishwadoot, Jubak, Naoroz and the Monthly Shantipur. However, the most notable magazine was The Moslem Bharat (1920). Huq was also the vice-president of the Bengal Muslim Literary Society, from where he developed a friendship with Qazi Nazrul Islam and Nobel laureate Rabindranath Tagore, both of whom wrote articles for the society. The Calcutta-based Bangiya Sahitya Parishat later conferred the title of Kavyakantha upon Huq.

Some of his works include:

Poetry 
 (1881)
 (1885)
 (1898)
 (1903)
 (1912)
 (1923)

Prose 
 (1896)
 (1898, dedicated to Mearajuddin Ahmad)
 (1909)
 (1914, 2nd ed)
 (1918)
 (1919)
 (1931)

Novels 
 (1917)
 (1919)

Family and death 
He died on 30 November 1933 in Shantipur. Sir Azizul Haque was his eldest son.

See also
 Ismail Hossain Siraji
 Kaykobad

References 

 Kalyani Nag, Santipur Prasanga: Vol-2 ( Santipur,1998 )
 Kalikrishna Bhattacharya, Santipur Parichoy:-Vol 1 & 2 (Santipur Municipality, 1952)
 Letter written by Rabindranath Tagore to Mohammed Mozammel Haque (Page No.6) 

1860 births
1933 deaths
Bengali male poets
19th-century Bengali poets
20th-century Bengali poets
Indian male poets
Bengali-language writers
Muslim poets
Bengali Muslims
Shantipur
People from Nadia district
19th-century Indian poets
20th-century Indian poets
Poets from West Bengal
19th-century Indian male writers
20th-century Indian male writers
Scholars from West Bengal